Andrew Gray may refer to:

Politics 
Andrew Gray, 1st Lord Gray (1390–1469), Scottish diplomat and noble
Andrew Gray (senator) (died 1849), Democratic-Republican member of the Delaware Senate, 1817–1821
Andrew C. Gray (1804–1885), entrepreneur and Whig delegate to the Delaware Constitutional Convention of 1853

Sports 
Andy Gray (cricketer) (born 1974), former Yorkshire and Derbyshire cricketer
Andy Gray (footballer, born 1955), Scottish footballer, commentator, and beIN Sports pundit
Andy Gray (footballer, born 1964), English footballer and former coach of the Sierra Leone national team
Andy Gray (footballer, born 1973), English footballer who played for Reading and Leyton Orient
Andy Gray (footballer, born 1977), Scottish footballer who played for clubs including Leeds United, Nottingham Forest, Barnsley and Bradford City

Others 
Andrew Gray (17th-century divine) (1633–1656), Scottish divine
Andrew Gray (19th-century divine) (1805–1861), Scottish Presbyterian divine
Andrew Gray (surveyor) (1820–1862), American surveyor
Andrew Gray (physicist) (1847–1925), physicist and assistant to Lord Kelvin
Andrew Gray (anthropologist) (1955–1999), anthropologist and indigenous rights worker
Andrew Gray (writer) (born 1968), Scottish-born Canadian short story writer and novelist
Andrew Gray (zoologist) (born 1963), British zoologist, teacher and conservationist
Andrew Gray, former member of the band Hoots & Hellmouth
Andy Gray (actor) (1959–2021), Scottish comedy actor
Andy Gray (musician) (born 1970), composed the Big Brother UK TV theme (with Paul Oakenfold)
Andrew Sexton Gray (1826–1907), Irish–Australian surgeon and ophthalmologist